is a Japanese performing artist and a former member of the Takarazuka Revue, where she specialized in playing male characters (Otokoyaku). She joined the revue in 1989 and resigned in 2006. She is from Iruma, Saitama .

She is the only Otokoyaku and the only student in her class to reach top star status. Also, she is the first otokoyaku top star who joined the company during the Heisei era.

Troupe history
 Star Troupe: 1989–1997
 Cosmos Troupe: 1998–1999
 Superior Members: 2000–2002
 Star Troupe: 2003–2006

General information
Kozuki is 174 cm tall.  When she gained the top star status of Star Troupe, where she started her Takarazuka career, she became the tallest of top stars of the five troupes in 2003  Because of her height, she provided a strong male image on the stage. She progressed gradually after graduating from the New Actor Show cast. One of her notable roles in the 1990s is Lord Henry Wotton of The Picture of Dorian Gray. In 1997, she got her first Takarazuka Bow Hall show (Angels at Dawn).

One of the characteristics of her Takarazuka career is that she had participated in the most overseas performances among her generation: New York City in 1992, London in 1994, Hong Kong in 1998 and Seoul in 2005 (performing Rose of Versailles as a part of the celebration of the establishment of Japan-Korea relationship).

Upon the founding the Cosmos Troupe, she participated in her second production of Elisabeth in 1998 and got great applause with her portrayal of Luigi Lucheni (she played Elmer Batthyany in the 1996-7 Star Troupe production). In the 1998 production of Wuthering Heights, she had the role of Edgar in the previous Snow production, who later succeeded her to be the top star of Star Troupe). During the founding era of Cosmos, she got her second Bow Hall lead (The Tempest, as a part of Bow Shakespeare Series) in 1999.

During her Senka era, she participated in the production of Cosmos, Star, Snow and Moon. Also, she got a lead of show at the Tokyo special performance Singing in the Midnight (a production of Snow Troupe).  Joining her as female lead was Hikaru Asami, a former troupe mate of Cosmos. When she participated in the Senka-Flower and Senka-Snow production of Gone with the Wind in 2002, she became the first to be in all five troupe productions in the company.

In 2003, she performed in A Song for Kingdoms (Takarazuka's own version of Aida), and in 2005 Rose of Versailles and Soul of Sheba in Korea. Too Short a Time to Fall in Love and Neo Dandyism! followed the next year, when she resigned from Takarazuka. Her first performance after the resignation, in the same year, was the Japanese production of Damn Yankees as Lola.

Notable Performance and Role

Takarazuka Era

Star New Actor Era

 I Won't Forget the Young Day's Song - Maki Bunshirou (First leading role)
 Casanova, Memento of a Dream - Casanova
  A Map Without Borders - Herman (Her role in regular cast is John Miller)
 The Story of a Sword, Love, and a Rainbow - Edmond

Star Era

 Elisabeth - Elmer
 The Picture of Dorian Gray - Lord Henry Wotton (Bow Hall)
 The Spirit of the Samurai - Ryousuke Kuroda
 Angels at Dawn - Alvar (first Bow Hall leading performance)

Cosmos Era

Excalibur - Andrew/Christopher 
Elisabeth - Luigi Lucheni
Wuthering Heights - Edgar 
Passion: Jose and Carmen - Escamillio
The Tempest - Ferdinand 
Black Rose of the Desert - Zelim
Mayerling - Archduke Jan Salvador

Senka Era

 Gone with the Wind (Senka-Snow & Senka-Flower) - Ashley Wilkes

With Cosmos Troupe

Nostalgia Across the Sea - Akizuki Kuroudo
Castel Mirage - Richard Taylor (only at Grand Theater)

With Moon Troupe

Great Pirates - Edgar (only at Tokyo)
At the End of a Long Spring - Claude

With Snow Troupe

Singing in the Moonlight - Lui Man-fu (leading)
In Search of El Dorado - Soujirou Gotou

With Star Troupe

Rose of Versailles - Andre

Star Top Star Era

A Song for Kingdoms (Takarazuka's own version of Aida) - Radames (Top Star Debut at Grand Theater)
Eternal Prayer: The Revolution of the World of Louis XVII - Louis
Butterfly Lovers/ Southern Cross III - Yukiwaka
A Love Story in 1914 - Aristide Bruant
Ch'ang-an, Full of Swirling Flowers - Hsan Tsung
Shigure Hill Road in Nagasaki - Unosuke 
Rose of Versailles - Fersen and Marie-Antoinette - Hans Axel Von Fersen
Rose of Versailles - Oscar and Andre - Andre (Special appearance for Snow Troupe)
Copacabana - Stephen/Toni Forte
Too Short a Time to Fall in Love - Fred Walbask(Michael Wayne) (Last musical with Takarazuka)

Personal Concert

 Next I
 Aqua - The Blue Sky
 Across

Selected performances after Takarazuka

Stage

Damn Yankees - Lola
All Shook Up - Miss Sandra
Calamity Jane - Calamity Jane
 COCO(musical) - noel
 Silk Stockings(musical) - Ninotchka
BLUES IN THE NIGHT (musical)
ELECTRIC CITY  - Co-starring The Movement 
DANCE LEGEND vol.1 BADGIRLS meets BADBOYS -Co-starring Rasta Thomas and Bad Boys Of Dance　
DANCE LEGEND vol.2 Argentango -produced by Gustavo Zajac 
TAKARAZUKA OG version CHICAGO -Velma

References

Japanese actresses
Takarazuka Revue
1971 births
Living people
People from Iruma, Saitama